

Caribbean
The Caribbean section was also known as the CFU Youth Cup.

First round

Group A

Group B

Group C

Group D

Group E

Group F

Group G

Second round

Group A

Group B

Third-place match

Final

Qualification

The finalists ,  and the winner of the third place match  qualified for the 2007 CONCACAF U17 Tournament;  qualified as hosts.

Central America
Hosted in El Salvador.

Honduras did not participate as they were host of the final tournament.
Belize did not participate.

References

External links
 https://www.concacaf.com/en/under-17s-women/under-17-s-women-about 

2007 CONCACAF U17 Tournament
CONCACAF U-17 Championship qualification